is a former Japanese football player. He played for the Japan national team.

He is a cousin of Koki Mizuno. His wife is Japanese actress Hiroko Hatano.

Club career
After graduating from Tokai University Shoyo High School, he joined J2 League side Urawa Reds in 2000. His first professional appearance came in an Emperor's Cup match against Honda Lock SC on 3 December 2000. He broke into Urawa's first team in 2001 and became a mainstay in midfielder. He contributed to the club winning the J1 League championship in 2006 and was chosen as one of the 2006 J.League Best XI. In 2007, the club won the champions AFC Champions League and the 3rd place Club World Cup. He was also elected Japanese Footballer of the Year award. Although he played many matches every seasons, he lost opportunity to play in 2015. In October, he announced that he would be leaving his only club at the end of that season. After the last game of 2015 regular season in November, he announced his retirement from football.

National team career
Suzuki was captain for Japan U-23 national team throughout the 2004 Summer Olympics Qualifiers. However, he was not included in the final squad for the 2004 Summer Olympics as manager Masakuni Yamamoto favoured overage player Shinji Ono.

Japan national team manager Ivica Osim rated Suzuki highly and handed him his first senior cap on 9 August 2006, in a friendly match against Trinidad and Tobago. He was the only player who started all 20 matches under Osim's reign. Osim once referred to him as the Japanese answer to Claude Makélélé. He played 28 games for Japan until 2008.

Club statistics

1Includes J.League Championship, Japanese Super Cup, A3 Champions Cup and FIFA Club World Cup.

National team statistics

Appearances in major competitions

International goals
Scores and results list Japan's goal tally first.

Under-23

Honours

Japan
Afro-Asian Cup of Nations: 1
 2007

Club
Urawa Red Diamonds
J1 League: 1
 2006
J1 League First Stage: 1
 2015
Emperor's Cup: 2
 2005, 2006
J.League Cup: 1
 2003
AFC Champions League: 1
 2007
Japanese Super Cup: 1
 2006

Individual
Japanese Footballer of the Year: 1
 2007
J.League Best XI: 2
 2006, 2007

References

External links
 
 
 Japan National Football Team Database
 
 
  

1981 births
Living people
Association football people from Shizuoka Prefecture
Japanese footballers
Japan international footballers
J1 League players
J2 League players
Urawa Red Diamonds players
2007 AFC Asian Cup players
Asian Games medalists in football
Footballers at the 2002 Asian Games
Association football midfielders
Asian Games silver medalists for Japan
Medalists at the 2002 Asian Games